This is a list of all tornadoes that were confirmed by local offices of the National Weather Service in the United States in March 2012.

United States yearly total

March

March 1 event

March 2 event

March 3 event

March 9 event

March 11 event

March 12 event

March 15 event

March 17 event

March 18 event

March 19 event

March 20 event

March 21 event

March 22 event

March 23 event

March 24 event

March 28 event

March 30 event

See also
 Tornadoes of 2012

Notes

References

 03
Tornado,03
Tornado
2012, 03